This is an incomplete list of films shot in the Las Vegas Valley in the U.S. state of Nevada.

Films

See also 

 List of films set in Las Vegas
 Cinema of the United States
 Cinema of the world

References 

 
Films shot in Las Vegas
Las Vegas